Clare-Hope Ashitey (born 12 February 1987) is an English actress. She attended the Centre Stage School of Performing Arts, Southgate while being educated at The Latymer School, located in the Edmonton area of London, for seven years.

She took a gap year between school and university to work on the film Children of Men (2006). In 2018, she starred in the Netflix Original crime drama series Seven Seconds.

Early life and education
Ashitey was born in Enfield to Tina, a medical secretary, and Paul, a dentist, who are both from Ghana, and has an older sister (Grace, who studied at the University of Warwick), and an older brother. Ashitey attended Brimsdown primary school in Brimsdown, Enfield before being educated at The Latymer School in Edmonton, North London. She graduated in anthropology from SOAS, University of London in 2009.

Filmography

Film

Television

Theatre

Video games

References

External links

Yahoo! Movies, yahoo.com. Accessed 5 December 2022.

1987 births
English film actresses
English television actresses
Living people
People from Enfield, London
English people of Ghanaian descent
Black British actresses
Alumni of SOAS University of London
People educated at The Latymer School
21st-century English actresses